Carl Franz Robinow (10 April 1909 – 20 October 2006) was a German researcher in bacterial and fungal cytology. He studied medicine in Freiburg and Vienna, obtained his M.D. in Hamburg in 1934. Following formative research experience in Denmark, England, and the U.S. he came to Canada in 1949 and worked in Department of Bacteriology and Immunology, Faculty of Medicine, University of Western Ontario.

References

External links
Obituaries

German microbiologists
1909 births
2006 deaths
German emigrants to Canada